The Pedra das Flores Natural Monument is a municipal natural monument in the state of Rio de Janeiro, Brazil.

Location

The Pedra das Flores Natural Monument is in the municipality of São José do Vale do Rio Preto, Rio de Janeiro.
It is in the Serra do Capim.
It is one of the main conservation areas in the municipality along with the Serra do Taquaruçu (Araponga Municipal Nature Park) and Serra da Maravilha (Maravilha Environmental Protection Area).
The monument has vegetation of alpine meadows, rich in bromeliads and orchids.

History

The Pedra das Flores Natural Monument was created by municipal decree 1.651 of 2005.
That year the conservation unit was swept by a fire started by a farmer on pasture beside the site.
It was included in the Central Rio de Janeiro Atlantic Forest Mosaic, created in December 2006.
The monument has suffered from vandalism by people opposed to creating the unit.
In 2009 the unit was again partially consumed by a fire that burned all the vegetation from the banks of the Calçado River to the rock wall that leads to the Campo Dois, a favorite location for camping and climbing.

Notes

Sources

2006 establishments in Brazil
Natural monuments of Brazil
Protected areas of Rio de Janeiro (state)